Várpalota (German: Burgschloß) is a town in Western Hungary, in the Transdanubian county of Veszprém. It was a mining town during the Socialist era, but the mines have been closed. Most of the citizens work in the nearby cities, Veszprém or Székesfehérvár.

History 
The town's origins are linked to the Roman and Avar periods, as testified verified by burial mounds, tombstones and Roman artifacts in the outskirts of the town, some of which can be found in the lapidary of Thury Castle.

In the Middle Ages it was a flourishing market town. In the 20th century it became a center for coal mining.

Main sights
The Thury castle, located in the heart of the town. It was commanded, among the others, by  György Thury. It is currently home to the Museum of Chemistry, and the collection of the memories of coal mining. Concerts and theatre performances are held there every summer.
The old Catholic church, home to Romanesque and early-Gothic frescos in a particularly good condition. One of the World War I memorials erected in those days and destroyed in the tempests of the history can be found here.
Jó Szerencsét (Good Luck) Community Centre, which houses four large-sized Gobelin works of Noémi Ferenczy. The one-man exhibition of Frigyes Matzon, one of the significant representatives of constructivism can be visited in the nearby Nagy Gyula Gallery, which was converted from a  synagogue.
Baroque Reformed church with its irregularly arched western façade. It  was built on the walls of the formerly Hussar Castle. It houses  the memorial plaque of Mária Molnár.
Zichy Castle. The library-room with its  wooden cover and its frescos recalling mythological ages, is a regular place of cultural events. It also includes the Zichy-Chapel and the  altar carved from sandstone in the Catholic cemetery. Among the graves  are  the memorial of militiaman martyrs of the Hungarian Revolution and War of Independence belonging to the earl's family.
Memorials of the Hungarian Revolution and War of Independence in 1848–49, of the World War heroes and victims, of the heroes of Revolution in 1956.

Twin towns – sister cities

Várpalota is twinned with:

 Borgo San Lorenzo, Italy
 Czeladź, Poland
 Grottazzolina, Italy
 Gazipaşa, Turkey
 Kremnica, Slovakia
 Petroşani, Romania
 Sant'Elpidio a Mare, Italy
 Wolfsberg, Austria

References

External links
Várpalota Home Page

Populated places in Veszprém County
Socialist planned cities
Planned cities in Hungary